The 2023 Leipzig Kings season is the third season of the Leipzig Kings in the European League of Football history.

Preseason
After the two seasons, the management decided to part ways with head coach Fred Armstrong, after a troublesome seasons with many injuries of key position players.  A week later, Kings former offensive coordinator John Booker was introduced as the new head coach for the 2023 season.

After three different starting quarterbacks in the previous season, the Kings seek stability on this position with the signing of Kenyatte Allen from the GFL team Allgäu Comets. New and re-signings followed suit with defensive cornerstones Aslan Zetterberg, AJ Wentland, Lance Leota and AFI's defensive All-Star Roedion Henrique.

Regular season

Standings

Roster

Transactions
From Hamburg Sea Devils: Dominik Behrens 
From Stuttgart Surge: Noah Bomba 
From Berlin Thunder: Kélian-Mathis Mouliom

Staff

Notes

References

Leipzig Kings seasons
Leipzig Kings
Leipzig Kings